The Midwest Rugby League (MWRL) is a  rugby league football competition in the Midwest United States. In 2009 an organization named Midwest Rugby League was formed to promote rugby league in the Midwestern United States, and to operate the Stockyarders team from 2010 onwards.

Teams

See also 
Rugby league in the United States
List of rugby league competitions

References

External links

Rugby league in the United States
Rugby league competitions in the United States
Rugby league in Illinois